Vasilyevo is the name of several inhabited localities in Russia.

Arkhangelsk Oblast
As of 2010, one rural locality in Arkhangelsk Oblast bears this name:
Vasilyevo, Arkhangelsk Oblast, a village in Ukhotsky Selsoviet of Kargopolsky District

Republic of Bashkortostan
As of 2010, one rural locality in the Republic of Bashkortostan bears this name:
Vasilyevo, Republic of Bashkortostan, a village in Tyuldinsky Selsoviet of Kaltasinsky District

Republic of Karelia
As of 2010, one rural locality in the Republic of Karelia bears this name:
Vasilyevo, Republic of Karelia, a village in Medvezhyegorsky District

Kirov Oblast
As of 2010, one rural locality in Kirov Oblast bears this name:
Vasilyevo, Kirov Oblast, a village in Bezvodninsky Rural Okrug of Pizhansky District

Kostroma Oblast
As of 2010, one rural locality in Kostroma Oblast bears this name:
Vasilyevo, Kostroma Oblast, a village in Vasilyevskoye Settlement of Soligalichsky District

Leningrad Oblast
As of 2010, two rural localities in Leningrad Oblast bear this name:
Vasilyevo, Krasnoozernoye Settlement Municipal Formation, Priozersky District, Leningrad Oblast, a village in Krasnoozernoye Settlement Municipal Formation of Priozersky District
Vasilyevo, Melnikovskoye Settlement Municipal Formation, Priozersky District, Leningrad Oblast, a logging depot settlement in Melnikovskoye Settlement Municipal Formation of Priozersky District

Moscow Oblast
As of 2010, three rural localities in Moscow Oblast bear this name:
Vasilyevo, Kolomensky District, Moscow Oblast, a selo in Akatyevskoye Rural Settlement of Kolomensky District
Vasilyevo, Naro-Fominsky District, Moscow Oblast, a village in Volchenkovskoye Rural Settlement of Naro-Fominsky District
Vasilyevo, Ramensky District, Moscow Oblast, a village in Sofyinskoye Rural Settlement of Ramensky District

Nizhny Novgorod Oblast
As of 2010, two rural localities in Nizhny Novgorod Oblast bear this name:
Vasilyevo, Semyonov, Nizhny Novgorod Oblast, a village in Malozinovyevsky Selsoviet of the city of oblast significance of Semyonov
Vasilyevo, Koverninsky District, Nizhny Novgorod Oblast, a village in Khokhlomsky Selsoviet of Koverninsky District

Novgorod Oblast
As of 2010, one rural locality in Novgorod Oblast bears this name:
Vasilyevo, Novgorod Oblast, a village in Kirovskoye Settlement of Moshenskoy District

Pskov Oblast
As of 2010, one rural locality in Pskov Oblast bears this name:
Vasilyevo, Pskov Oblast, a village in Palkinsky District

Ryazan Oblast
As of 2010, one rural locality in Ryazan Oblast bears this name:
Vasilyevo, Ryazan Oblast, a village in Belovsky Rural Okrug of Klepikovsky District

Smolensk Oblast
As of 2010, four rural localities in Smolensk Oblast bear this name:
Vasilyevo, Kardymovsky District, Smolensk Oblast, a village in Tyushinskoye Rural Settlement of Kardymovsky District
Vasilyevo, Monastyrshchinsky District, Smolensk Oblast, a village in Sobolevskoye Rural Settlement of Monastyrshchinsky District
Vasilyevo, Knyazhinskoye Rural Settlement, Pochinkovsky District, Smolensk Oblast, a village in Knyazhinskoye Rural Settlement of Pochinkovsky District
Vasilyevo, Muryginskoye Rural Settlement, Pochinkovsky District, Smolensk Oblast, a village in Muryginskoye Rural Settlement of Pochinkovsky District

Tambov Oblast
As of 2010, one rural locality in Tambov Oblast bears this name:
Vasilyevo, Tambov Oblast, a village in Pokrovo-Vasilyevsky Selsoviet of Pichayevsky District

Republic of Tatarstan
As of 2010, two inhabited localities in the Republic of Tatarstan bear this name.

Urban localities
Vasilyevo, Zelenodolsky District, Republic of Tatarstan, an urban-type settlement in Zelenodolsky District

Rural localities
Vasilyevo, Mamadyshsky District, Republic of Tatarstan, a selo in Mamadyshsky District

Tver Oblast
As of 2010, five rural localities in Tver Oblast bear this name:
Vasilyevo, Bologovsky District, Tver Oblast, a village in Kaftinskoye Rural Settlement of Bologovsky District
Vasilyevo, Kashinsky District, Tver Oblast, a village in Farafonovskoye Rural Settlement of Kashinsky District
Vasilyevo, Torzhoksky District, Tver Oblast, a village in Bogatkovskoye Rural Settlement of Torzhoksky District
Vasilyevo, Udomelsky District, Tver Oblast, a village in Porozhkinskoye Rural Settlement of Udomelsky District
Vasilyevo, Vyshnevolotsky District, Tver Oblast, a village in Kholokholenskoye Rural Settlement of Vyshnevolotsky District

Udmurt Republic
As of 2010, two rural localities in the Udmurt Republic bear this name:
Vasilyevo, Glazovsky District, Udmurt Republic, a village in Urakovsky Selsoviet of Glazovsky District
Vasilyevo, Kiznersky District, Udmurt Republic, a selo in Vasilyevsky Selsoviet of Kiznersky District

Vladimir Oblast
As of 2010, one rural locality in Vladimir Oblast bears this name:
Vasilyevo, Vladimir Oblast, a village in Sudogodsky District

Vologda Oblast
As of 2010, seven rural localities in Vologda Oblast bear this name:
Vasilyevo, Babushkinsky District, Vologda Oblast, a village in Bereznikovsky Selsoviet of Babushkinsky District
Vasilyevo, Kirillovsky District, Vologda Oblast, a village in Migachevsky Selsoviet of Kirillovsky District
Vasilyevo, Igmassky Selsoviet, Nyuksensky District, Vologda Oblast, a settlement in Igmassky Selsoviet of Nyuksensky District
Vasilyevo, Kosmarevsky Selsoviet, Nyuksensky District, Vologda Oblast, a village in Kosmarevsky Selsoviet of Nyuksensky District
Vasilyevo, Sheksninsky District, Vologda Oblast, a village in Churovsky Selsoviet of Sheksninsky District
Vasilyevo, Vashkinsky District, Vologda Oblast, a village in Kisnemsky Selsoviet of Vashkinsky District
Vasilyevo, Velikoustyugsky District, Vologda Oblast, a village in Teplogorsky Selsoviet of Velikoustyugsky District

Yaroslavl Oblast
As of 2010, two rural localities in Yaroslavl Oblast bear this name:
Vasilyevo, Uglichsky District, Yaroslavl Oblast, a village in Vozdvizhensky Rural Okrug of Uglichsky District
Vasilyevo, Yaroslavsky District, Yaroslavl Oblast, a village in Lyutovsky Rural Okrug of Yaroslavsky District

See also
Vasily (disambiguation)
Vasilyev
Vasilyevsky (disambiguation)